Shuvel was an American rap metal band originally from Wichita, Kansas. The band released their major label debut album in 2000 through Interscope Records.

History
Original members Jeff Hollinger (vocals), Isaac Ayala (vocals) and Kyle Hollinger (drums) formed the band in 1997 in Wichita, Kansas. They added guitarist Ryan Stuber and bassist Carlos Sandoval. After playing local venues for a while, they moved to Phoenix, Arizona to further their career, spending six months there until then moving to Los Angeles. 

A stripper in attendance at the band's performance at a house party in San Pedro, California connected the band with an artist relations agent from Interscope Records in 1999. The band released their debut album Set It Off in late 2000. The band toured with Sevendust, Crazy Town, and Kittie, and landed a spot on the second stage of Ozzfest 2000.

The band was eventually left with only one vocalist, Isaac Ayala, due to the band kicking out Jeff Hollinger from the band after 2006. Shuvel continued to tour and release music until their dissolution in 2011. 

Shuvel drummer Kyle Hollinger later joined the band Crazy Town. Another Shuvel drummer Trevor Stafford went on to join Adelitas Way.

Musical style
According to Spin reviewer Greg Milner, the band's sound is a "mash-up of Beasties, Bizkit and Helmet."

Critical reception
Spin Magazine reviewer Greg Milner called the band's music "genuine head-bobbing/banging music" and "fine mainstream metal" in contrast to James Doolittle of The Morning Call who was unimpressed with the "metal|metal/rap routine" of Set It Off, going on to say that "you realize just how silly a copycat sounds when nothing new is brought to the table."  Tim Sheridan of Allmusic called it "an energetic but rather run-of-the-mill rap-metal disc".

Members
Final line-up
Isaac Ayala - Vocals (1997 - 2011)
Ryan Stuber - Guitar (1997 - 2011) 
Carlos Sandoval - Bass (1997 - 2011)
Josh Fresia - Drums (2005 - 2011)

Previous members
Jeff Hollinger - Vocals (1997 - 2006)
Kyle Hollinger - Drums (1998 - 2000)
Trevor Stafford - Drums (2001)
Keigan Veer - Guitar (1997)
Logan Dudley - Drums (1997)

Discography

Albums
Set It Off (2000)
Return Of The Fist (2006)
As The World Burns (2009)

EPs
The Demonstration (1999)
Demo (2003)

Singles

References

Musical groups established in 1997
Musical groups disestablished in 2011
Rap rock groups
Rock music groups from Texas